Stinnett is an unincorporated community in Leslie County, Kentucky, United States.

Geography 
Stinnett is located at  (37.09, -83.39500).

References 

Unincorporated communities in Kentucky
Unincorporated communities in Leslie County, Kentucky